The Milan Triennial XII was the Triennial in Milan sanctioned by the Bureau of International Expositions (BIE) on the 5 May 1959.
Its theme was House and School. 
It was held at the Palazzo dell'Arte and ran from 
16 July 1960 to 4 November 1960.

Antti Nurmesniemi and 
Birger Kaipiainen both won Grand Prix.
Ilmari Tapiovaara won a gold and 
Bertel Gardberg a silver medal.

References 

1960 in Italy
Tourist attractions in Milan
World's fairs in Milan